Twin Lakes Airport may refer to:

 Twin Lakes Airport (North Carolina) in Mocksville, North Carolina, United States (FAA: 8A7)
 Twin Lakes Airport (South Carolina) in Graniteville, South Carolina, United States (FAA: S17)
 closed Andros Central Airport near Andros Town, Andros Islands, the Bahamas